This is a list of Estonian television related events from 1964.

Events
 November – new television mast was erected in Pärnu.

Debuts

Television shows

Ending this year

Births

Deaths

See also
 1964 in Estonia

References

1960s in Estonian television